Murielle is a feminine given name. People with the name include:

Murielle Ahouré (born 1987), Ivorian sprinter 
Murielle Celimene, a representative of Martinique at Miss Earth 2004
Murielle Magellan (born 1967), French writer and theater director
Murielle Adrienne Orais, a model, environmentalist, nurse, and beauty queen from the Philippines
Murielle Telio, American actress

See also 

 Muriel (given name)

French feminine given names